Karosa C 954 is an intercity bus produced by bus manufacturer Karosa from the Czech Republic, in the years 2002 to 2006. In 2003, the modernised version C954E was introduced. It was succeeded by Irisbus Crossway in 2006.

Construction features 
Karosa C 954 is the basic model of Karosa 900 series. C 954 is unified with city bus models such as B 952 and B 961. The body was assembled to the skeleton which has undergone a dip stage, sheets were galvanized and painted, and then additional components were installed. The body is a semi-self-supporting frame, with the engine and manual gearbox placed in the rear part. Only the rear axle is propulsed. Front and rear axles are solid. All axles are mounted on air suspension. On the right side are two doors. Inside are used cloth seats. The driver's cab is not separated from the rest of the vehicle.

Production and operation 
In 2002 serial production started, which continued until 2006. Since 200, buses were produced only in the modernised C 954 E version, which had glass glued to the skeleton instead of glass mounted in rubber, and better ventilation of the engine compartment.

See also 

 Article about Karosa C 954 buses in Prague
 Photogallery of Karosa C 954
 Technical specs on manufacturers webpage (on web archive)

 List of buses

Buses manufactured by Karosa
Buses of the Czech Republic
Vehicles introduced in 2002